Vilmos Vanczák (born 20 June 1983 in Miskolc) is a retired Hungarian footballer who played as a full-back.

Club career

Újpest
Vanczák started to play football in his hometown's club, Diósgyőri VTK, and made his first-team debut at the age of 15. He spent the following season in the youth team of Vasas and joined Újpest FC in 2001. He spent the autumn of 2002 in Újpest's second league 'B' team, Újpest FC-Fót on loan, and joined again the first team of Újpest in 2003.

Sint-Truiden
After his debut in the national team of Hungary, he joined Belgian team Sint-Truiden. In 2007, he returned from loan and joined Újpest FC for the third time.

Sion
On 17 July 2007 Vanczák signed a four-year contract with FC Sion. Vanczák has been playing for FC Sion in the Swiss Super League since 2007. In 2011 he scored one of the goals as Sion defeated Neuchâtel Xamax FCS 2-0 in the Swiss Cup Final.

International career

On 3 March 2010 Vanczák scored his first international goal against Russia in a friendly match in Győr at the ETO Park. The match finished 1–1. On 6 September Vanczák scored the first goal in the Euro 2012 qualifier against Moldova at the Zimbru Stadium in Chişinău which secured the victory. Hungary won by 2–0.

Lionel Messi was sent off on his international debut for Argentina in a friendly against Hungary on 17 August 2005, after being judged to have fouled Vanczák.

Career statistics

International

International goals
Score and Result lists Hungary's goals first

Honours

Újpest FC
Hungarian National Championship I (1): 2003–04

FC Sion
Swiss Cup (2): 2008–09, 2010–11

References

External links
 Vilmos Vanczák profile at magyarfutball.hu
 Profile on mlsz.hu 
 Profile on hlsz.hu 
 
 
 
 
 
 Spielerprofil FC Sion-Online

Living people
1983 births
Hungarian footballers
Association football defenders
Hungary international footballers
Belgian Pro League players
Swiss Super League players
Sint-Truidense V.V. players
Újpest FC players
FC Sion players
Sportspeople from Miskolc
Hungarian expatriate footballers
Expatriate footballers in Belgium
Expatriate footballers in Switzerland